The women's team competition was a gymnastics event contested as part of the Gymnastics at the 1968 Summer Olympics programme at the National Auditorium in Mexico City.

Results 

The score for each team was the sum of its six members' best scores. On each of the four apparatuses, the top five scores in each category (compulsory and optional) were counted, for a total of 10 scores per apparatus. The maximum possible team score was 400.

References

Official Olympic Report
www.gymnasticsresults.com 
www.gymn-forum.net

Women's team all-around
1968 in women's gymnastics
Women's events at the 1968 Summer Olympics